Jim Paul Chiapuzio (April 3, 1925 – September 20, 1988) was an American football, wrestling, and baseball coach.  He served as the head football coach at Concordia University in Saint Paul, Minnesota from 1969 to 1972, where he was the first coach in that program's history, completing a record of 18–15. He also served as the wrestling and baseball coach at Concordia, earning a 28–23 in baseball with one Twin River Collegiate Conference championship.

Chiapuzio also began the wrestling program at North Bend High School in North Bend, Oregon in 1953, where he served until moving to Concordia in 1965. He finished his career at Sheldon High School in Eugene, Oregon, retiring in 1986.

Head coaching record

College football

References

External links
 Concordia (MN) Hall of Fame profile

1925 births
1988 deaths
Concordia Golden Bears baseball coaches
Concordia Golden Bears football coaches
College wrestling coaches in the United States
High school wrestling coaches in the United States
People from North Bend, Oregon
Sportspeople from Eugene, Oregon